Downstream Bravo Camp was a manned camp in Antarctica. It served as a refueling station for planes. It is currently unmanned.

See also
Antarctic field camps

References

Geography of Antarctica